Lee Kar Wai "Calvin" (born 3 April 1983 in Hong Kong) is a Hong Konger archer. He competed in the individual event at the 2012 Summer Olympics.

References 

Hong Kong male archers
1983 births
Living people
Archers at the 2012 Summer Olympics
Olympic archers of Hong Kong
Hong Kong people
Archers at the 2014 Asian Games
Archers at the 2018 Asian Games
Asian Games competitors for Hong Kong